Nerkin Horatagh or Ashaghy Oratagh is a village de facto in the Martakert Province of the breakaway Republic of Artsakh, de jure in the Tartar District of Azerbaijan, in the disputed region of Nagorno-Karabakh. The village has an ethnic Armenian-majority population, and also had an Armenian majority in 1989. The village is located close to the town of Martakert.

History 
During the Soviet period, the village was a part of the Mardakert District of the Nagorno-Karabakh Autonomous Oblast.

Historical heritage sites 
Historical heritage sites in and around the village include a church built in 1094, a medieval cemetery, the church of Surb Astvatsatsin built in 1904-1914, and St. George's Church built in 2012.

Economy and culture 
The population is mainly engaged in agriculture, animal husbandry, and mining. As of 2015, the village has a municipal building, a secondary school, 10 shops, and a medical centre.

Demographics 
The village had 776 inhabitants in 2005, and 840 inhabitants in 2015.

References

External links 
 

Populated places in Martakert Province
Populated places in Tartar District